Terrell Joseph-Nathaniel Burgess (born November 12, 1998) is an American football free safety for the New York Giants of the National Football League (NFL). He played college football at Utah and was drafted by the Los Angeles Rams in the third round of the 2020 NFL Draft.

Early years
Burgess attended San Marcos High School in San Marcos, California. He played defensive back and wide receiver in high school. He committed to the University of Utah to play college football.

College career
Burgess played at Utah from 2016 to 2019. After spending his first three seasons as mostly a backup, he was a full-time starter his senior year in 2019. During his career, he had 116 tackles and one interception.

Professional career

Los Angeles Rams
Burgess was drafted by the Los Angeles Rams with the 104th overall pick in the third round of the 2020 NFL Draft. He suffered a broken ankle in Week 7 and was placed on injured reserve on October 27, 2020. Burgess won Super Bowl LVI when the Rams defeated the Cincinnati Bengals. He was waived on November 8, 2022.

New York Giants
On November 10, 2022, the New York Giants signed Burgess to their practice squad. On November 23, 2022, Burgess was elevated from the practice squad for week 12 game against the Dallas Cowboys.

References

External links
Utah Utes bio

1998 births
Living people
People from San Marcos, California
Players of American football from California
Sportspeople from San Diego County, California
American football safeties
American football cornerbacks
Utah Utes football players
Los Angeles Rams players
New York Giants players
People from Oceanside, California